John Julian Somers (12 November 1903 – 11 November 1976), known as Julian Somers, was a prolific English stage and screen actor.

Career
By 1934, Somers was appearing in rep at Croydon. In 1937, he was on stage in Jeffrey Dell's play Night Alone at the Embassy Theatre with Alexander Archdale. In 1944, he appeared as the White Rabbit in a stage production of Alice in Wonderland.

Early film roles came in The Peterville Diamond (1942) and Caravan (1946). Outside his developing screen career as a supporting actor, Somers continued to be heard in BBC radio productions and to appear in West End theatre plays and reviews.

Private life
In October 1939, Somers was living with his mother, Ethel M. Somers, at Wolnoth, Park Lane, Leatherhead, and was registered as an actor. 
In the summer of 1950, he married Betty Margaret Newcombe at Finsbury. They had three sons and a daughter.

Death 
Somers died in London in 1976, aged 72. At the time of his death, he was living at 33, Wharton Street, Clerkenwell. He was cremated at Islington.

Filmography

Film
The Peterville Diamond (1942) as Andre 
Caravan (1946) as Manoel
The Small Back Room (1949) as Dr Bryan 
Diamond City (1949) as van Niekerk 
Hunted (1952) as Jack Lloyd 
The Gambler and the Lady (1952) as Licasi
The Story of Robin Hood and His Merrie Men (1952) as Posse leader 
 Three Steps to the Gallows (1953) as John Durante 
The Long Memory (1953) as Delaney
Fatal Journey (1954) as Goff 
 The Battle of the River Plate (1956) as Quartermaster of Graf Spee
The Moonraker (1957) as Captain Foster 
 The One That Got Away (1957) as Clerk
Time Without Pity (1957) as First Warder
Battle of the V-1 (1957) as Reichsfuehrer
 Miracle in Soho (1957) as Potter
 A Night to Remember (1958) as Bull
 Another Time, Another Place (1958) as Hotel Manager 
Room at the Top (1959) as St Clair 
The Giant Behemoth (1959) as Rear Admiral Summers 
Sink the Bismarck! (1960) as Civilian on HMS Prince of Wales
 Reluctant Bandit (1965)
 Far from the Madding Crowd (1967) as Jan Coggan
 The Snow Goose (1971) as Jim

Television
 The Adventures of Robin Hood: “The Crusaders” (1958) as Sir Paul
The Invisible Man: “Blind Justice” (1959) as Simmons
The Avengers, episode "Man in the Mirror" (1963), as Mike Brown
Coronation Street (1963) as Ministry of Pensions Supervisor
 Gideon's Way: “The Great Plane Robbery” (1965) as Cameron
ITV Play of the Week: The Winds of Green Monday (1965) as Bosun Brien
Thursday Theatre: “Celebration” (1965) as Arthur Broadbent
Churchill's People: “A Wilderness of Roses” (1975) as John Mauteby

Notes

External links
 
 Julian Somers, aveleyman.com

1903 births
1976 deaths
English male stage actors
English male film actors
People from Clerkenwell